Town Bordowali is one of the 60 Legislative Assembly constituencies of Tripura state in India. It is in West Tripura district and is part of Tripura West (Lok Sabha constituency).

Members of Legislative Assembly 

^ by-poll

Election results

2023

2022 by-election

2018 election

2013 election

See also
List of constituencies of the Tripura Legislative Assembly
West Tripura district

References

West Tripura district
Assembly constituencies of Tripura